The Boston Junior Blackhawks are a Junior "A" ice hockey team from Saugus, Massachusetts.  They are a member of the International Junior Hockey League. The Jr. Blackhawks field teams in the IJHL Super Elite League, IJHL Elite League, as well as youth selects and other youth ice hockey levels in other local youth hockey leagues. The Jr. Blackhawks play their home games at the Kasabuski Memorial Ice Arena. The Boston Junior Blackhawks are the affiliate of the Texas Tornado of the Tier II Jr A North American Hockey League.

Alumni
The Jr. Blackhawks have produced over 300 alumni playing in higher levels of junior ice hockey, Major Jr., NCAA Division I and Division III, and ACHA college programs, and professional hockey, including:
 Paul D'Agostino - Evansville IceMen (AAHL
 Jimmy Pellegrino - Jamestown Vikings (Mid Atlantic Hockey League (2007) MAHL
 Lukas Dvorak - ATUS Weiz (Oberliga)
 Joe Pannullo - Jeff Wyler Chevrolet (Chiller Adult Hockey League)
 Kyle McCullough - Brooklyn Aces (EPHL, Bloomington PrairieThunder (IHL) 
 Simo Pulkki - SaiPa (SM-liiga)
 Rob Lalonde - Reading Royals (ECHL), Toronto Marlies (AHL)

References

External links
 Official Team Website
 Official League Website

1995 establishments in Massachusetts
Ice hockey clubs established in 1995
Ice hockey teams in Massachusetts
Junior ice hockey teams in the United States
Saugus, Massachusetts
Sports in Essex County, Massachusetts